West Cornwall was a county constituency in the House of Commons of the Parliament of the United Kingdom. It elected two Members of Parliament (MPs) by the bloc vote system of election.

Boundaries 
In 1832 the county of Cornwall, in south west England, was split for parliamentary purposes into two county divisions. These were the West division (with a place of election at Truro) and East Cornwall (where voting took place at Bodmin). Each division returned two members to Parliament.

The parliamentary boroughs included in the West division, between 1832 and 1885, (whose non-resident 40 shilling freeholders were eligible to vote in the county constituency) were Helston, Penryn and Falmouth, St Ives and Truro. (Source: Stooks Smith).

1832–1885: The Hundreds of Kerrier, and Penwith, and in the hundred of Powder, the western division, i.e. the parishes of St Allen, St Anthony in Roseland, St Clement, Cornelly, Creed-with-Grampound, Cuby-with-Tregony, St Erme, Feock, Gerrans, St Just in Roseland (with St Mawes), Kea, Kenwyn, Lamorran, Merther, St Michael Penkevil, Philleigh, Probus, Ruan Lanihorne, Truro St Mary, Veryan, and in the hundred of Pydar, the parishes of St Agnes, Crantock, Cubert, Newlyn, St Enoder, and Perranzabuloe, and the Isles of Scilly.

History 
During the 53-year history of this division, there was never a contested election. Only once was a Conservative member returned, but he only represented the constituency for a few months before becoming the 2nd Earl of Falmouth.

In 1885 this division was abolished, when the East and West Cornwall county divisions were replaced by six new single-member county constituencies. These were Bodmin (the South-Eastern division), Camborne (North-Western division), Launceston (North-Eastern division), St Austell (Mid division), St Ives (the Western division) and Truro. In addition the last remaining Cornish borough constituency was Penryn and Falmouth.

Members of Parliament 
 Constituency created (1832)

Election results

Elections in the 1830s

Charles Lemon had been Whig Member of Parliament for Cornwall prior to the 1832 election. Edward Wynne-Pendarves had also been a Member of Parliament in the previous parliament.

Elections in the 1840s

Boscawen-Rose succeeded to the peerage, becoming 2nd Earl of Falmouth and causing a by-election.

Elections in the 1850s

Wynne-Pendarves' death caused a by-election.

John Tremayne had planned to stand for election, but withdrew.

Williams' death caused a by-election.

George Williams, younger son of Michael, had withdrawn to avoid "disturbing the County".

Elections in the 1860s

Elections in the 1870s

Elections in the 1880s

See also 

List of former United Kingdom Parliament constituencies
Parliamentary representation from Cornwall

References 
 Boundaries of Parliamentary Constituencies 1885-1972, compiled and edited by F.W.S. Craig (Parliamentary Reference Publications 1972)
 British Parliamentary Election Results 1832-1885, compiled and edited by F.W.S. Craig (Macmillan Press 1977)
 The Parliaments of England by Henry Stooks Smith (1st edition published in three volumes 1844–50), second edition edited (in one volume) by F.W.S. Craig (Political Reference Publications 1973)
 Who's Who of British Members of Parliament: Volume I 1832-1885, edited by M. Stenton (The Harvester Press 1976)
 Who's Who of British Members of Parliament, Volume II 1886-1918, edited by M. Stenton and S. Lees (Harvester Press 1978)

Parliamentary constituencies in Cornwall (historic)
Constituencies of the Parliament of the United Kingdom established in 1832
Constituencies of the Parliament of the United Kingdom disestablished in 1885